An interosseous membrane is a thick dense fibrous sheet of connective tissue that spans the space between two bones, forming a type of syndesmosis joint.

Interosseous membranes in the human body:
 Interosseous membrane of forearm
 Interosseous membrane of leg

Gallery

Notes

External links
 
 

Skeletal system